The 1926 WAFL season was the 42nd season of senior football in Perth, Western Australia.

Desire had existed upon some stakeholders to expand the competition ever since it contracted to six clubs during World War I, but because districts were not applied to the senior competition until 1925, the leading contenders, former club Midland Junction and established B-grade club Claremont-Cottesloe, were not able to attract or keep top players. Claremont, wearing the blue and gold colours of the local swimming club, were admitted at a meeting on 19 August 1925 and made their debut in 1926 but former “B” grade Claremont juniors with established WAFL clubs like Jerry Dolan and Pat Rodriguez were permitted to stay with their current clubs. Claremont had an exceedingly  inexperienced team and were only able to win one game and that by a single point. Patronisingly called the “babies” in their early years in the WAFL, Claremont were not to finish above second-last in their first ten seasons, and were not helped by being the worst sufferer from the interstate recruiting drives of VFL clubs when the Great Depression began.

West Perth, who had been last in 1924 but had a new grandstand constructed during the season at their eleven-year-old home base of Leederville, rivalled them until September before the Royals showed themselves clearly the best team in the run home. Subiaco, who had developed what many regard as the best team it ever fielded in the previous season, were disappointing until a stirring run from a mathematical chance for the four drives them to the Grand Final only to be thrashed – a scenario repeated by the Maroons in 1933.

Home-and-away season

Round 1

Round 2

Round 3

Round 4

Round 5

Round 6

Round 7

Round 8 (Foundation Day)

Round 9

Round 10

Round 11

Round 12

Round 13

Round 14

Round 15

Round 16

Round 17

Round 18

Round 19

Round 20

Round 21

Ladder

Finals

First semi-final

Second semi-final

Grand Final

References

External links
Official WAFL website
West Australian Football League (WAFL) Season 1926

West Australian Football League seasons
WAFL